Dié may refer to:
 Dié, Burkina Faso, a village in the Dapelogo Department
 蝶 (hanyu pinyin : dié), a Chinese character meaning butterfly
 Saint-Dié, a commune in Vosges département in northeastern France

See also
 Die (disambiguation)